Phönix was a cargo ship built in 1913 by Stettiner Oderwerke, Stettin, Germany for Dampfschifffahrtsgesellschaft Argo AG, Bremen, Germany. She served with a number of German shipping lines before being requistioned in 1939 by the Kriegsmarine as VP-106 Phönix, later serving as Sperrbrecher 36 and Sperrbrecher 136. She was scuttled at Saint-Nazaire, Loire-Inférieure, France on 25 August 1944.

Description
The engine was built by Stettiner Oderwereke. It was rated at 205nhp and drove a single screw propeller.

History
Phönix was built by Stettiner Oderwerke, Stettin, Germany for Dampfschifffahrtsgesellschaft Argo AG, Bremen. She was launched on 28 January 1913. Her port of registry was Bremen and the Code Letters QKGL were allocated.

In 1923, Dampfschifffahrtsgesellschaft Argo AG merged with the Roland Line, which was itself absorbed by Norddeutscher Lloyd in 1925/26. Phönix was transferred to Argo Reederei AG in 1933, then to Argo Reederei Richard Adler & Co. in 1937. Her Code Letters changed to DOBK in 1934.

On 1 October 1939, Phönix was requistioned by the Kriegsmarine for use as a Vorpostenboot. She served with 1 Vorpostenbootflotille as VP-106 Phönix. She was transferred to 3 Sperrbrecherflotille on 1 October 1940 and was designated Sperrbrecher 36, beinhg redesignated Sperrbrecher 136 on 1 August 1941. She was scuttled by her crew at Saint-Nazaire, Loire-Inférieure, France on 25 August 1944.

References

1913 ships
Ships built in Stettin
Steamships of Germany
Merchant ships of Germany
World War I merchant ships of Germany
World War II merchant ships of Germany
Auxiliary ships of the Kriegsmarine
Shipwrecks in the Bay of Biscay
Maritime incidents in August 1944